Walter Dobrogosz is a Professor Emeritus of North Carolina State University, best known for his discovery and further research on the probiotic bacterium Lactobacillus reuteri.

Professional life

Dobrogosz was born on September 3, 1933, in Albion, Pennsylvania. He grew up in Erie, Pennsylvania, and received his B.S., Masters, and Ph. D. degrees in bacteriology and biochemistry from Penn State University. In 1960-62, Dobrogosz held an NIH-supported postdoctoral fellowship at the University of Illinois at Urbana-Champaign, and afterwards began teaching at N.C. State University. He became a full Professor of Microbiology at N. C. State in 1968 and remained there until his retirement in 2003. While at N. C. State, he taught the graduate courses 'Metabolic Regulatory Mechanisms,' 'Microbial Physiology and Bioenergetics,' and 'Metabolism, Growth, and Regulation,' and the undergraduate courses "General Microbiology,' 'Microbial Metabolism,' and 'Microbes and World Affairs.'

Early in his research career, Dobrogosz studied metabolic regulation in such species as Escherichia coli and Salmonella typhimurium. In particular, his research focused on the phenomenon of catabolite repression, a regulatory system involving interactions of cyclic AMP, the catabolite repressor protein (CRP) complex, and the lac operon and other inducible systems in bacteria.

The focus of Dobrogosz's research shifted in 1985, when he and student Lars Axelsson identified L. reuteri, a new lactic acid bacterium. Later that year, while on a Fulbright Fellowship to study in Sweden, Dobrogosz and colleague Sven Lindgren discovered that L. reuteri produces a potent anti-microbial substance, which they termed "reuterin." Based on this, they hypothesized that the human-specific strain of L. reuteri had the potential to be a protective probiotic. Dobrogosz and his fellows obtained patents on both the bacterium and reuterin, and later began to market L. reuteri for its benefits to human and animal health.

Dobrogosz founded Probiologics International (PBI) in 1987, a company devoted to the commercial prospects of L. reuteri. PBI began to carry out human clinical trials, and found that L. reuteri is effective in preventing diarheal diseases and other gut infections. L. reuteri is now known to maintain intestinal health, prevent fungal, bacterial, and protozoal infections, and mediate the body's immune response. PBI was purchased by public investors in 1990, and later its name was changed to BioGaia AB. It continues to market L. reuteri, often contained in yogurt or milk-based products, worldwide.

Dobrogosz has been involved with the American Society for Microbiology (ASM) throughout his career. He has served on the editorial board of the ASM journal, chaired the Genetics and Physiology section of the ASM, and presided for two terms over the ASM's North Carolina branch.

Since retirement, Dobrogosz has remained an active advocate of the "probiotic concept"; the importance of microbes in human health. He continues to publish review articles on L. reuteri, in addition to attending and lecturing at conferences on probiotic and microbiological research.

Personal life

Though born in the United States, Dobrogosz is of Eastern European ancestry. His father was born in Warsaw, Poland (then under Russian control), and his mother was Slovac.

Professor Dobrogosz married his wife Donna in 1953 and is the father of four children, including musician Steve Dobrogosz, and grandfather of nine. He now lives in Raleigh, North Carolina.

Dobrogosz has been an avid athlete since his youth. In high school, he lettered in basketball, American football, and track and field. At Penn State University, he competed on the varsity track and field team as a hurdler.  In his adulthood Dobrogosz discovered handball, at which he also became very competitive. One of the premier handball players in North Carolina during the 1970s, Dobrogosz won many tournaments, including the 1975 and 1977 North Carolina amateur men's singles championships, and the 1972, 1974, 1980, and 1981 Raleigh YMCA doubles titles.

Selected publications

Sources
 http://microbiology.ncsu.edu/WJD/WJD.html
 http://www.biogaia.se/

References

21st-century American biologists
American microbiologists
Eberly College of Science alumni
North Carolina State University people
1933 births
Living people